As a Woman: What I Learned About Power, Sex, and the Patriarchy After I Transitioned is a memoir by Paula Stone Williams, published in 2021. The book was published by Atria Publishing, which is a subsidiary of Simon & Schuster.

Reception 
The book has been reviewed by the NY Journal of Books, the SF Chronicle, and the Washington Blade.

References  

Transgender autobiographies
2021 non-fiction books
American memoirs
2020s LGBT literature
LGBT literature in the United States
Atria Publishing Group books